Worcester's early importance is partly due to its position on trade routes, but also because it was a centre of Church learning and wealth, due to the very large possessions of the See and Priory accumulated in the Anglo-Saxon period. After the reformation, Worcester continued as a centre of learning, with two early Grammar schools with strong links to Oxford University.

The city was often important for strategic military reasons, being close to Gloucester and Oxford, as well as Wales, which led to a number of attacks and sieges in the conflicts of the early medieval period. For similar reasons, it was valuable to the crown in the English Civil Wars.

The city was a centre of the cloth trade, and later of glove production. It had a number of foundries and made machine tools for the car industry. 

In politics, Worcester often lagged behind other similar cities in municipal reform, and in the nineteenth and start of the twentieth century, retained corrupt electoral practices in Westminster elections long after gifts and bribes had been made unlawful.

Early history
The trade route which ran past Worcester, later forming part of the Roman Ryknild Street, dates to Neolithic times. The position commanded a ford over the River Severn (the river was tidal past Worcester prior to public works projects in the 1840s) and was fortified by the Britons around 400 BC. It would have been on the northern border of the Dobunni and probably subject to the larger communities of the Malvern hillforts.

Roman and British

The Roman settlement at the site passes unmentioned by Ptolemy's Geography, the Antonine Itinerary and the Register of Dignitaries, but would have grown up on the road opened between Glevum (Gloucester) and Viroconium (Wroxeter) in the 40s and 50s AD. It may have been the "Vertis" mentioned in the 7th century Ravenna Cosmography. Using charcoal from the Forest of Dean, the Romans operated pottery kilns and ironworks at the site and may have built a small fort. There is no sign of municipal buildings that would indicate an administrative role. Earthwork defences encompassed the settlement, surrounding around ten hectares of land.

In the 3rd century, Roman Worcester occupied a larger area than the subsequent medieval city, but silting of the Diglis Basin caused the abandonment of Sidbury. Industrial production ceased and the settlement contracted to a defended position along the lines of the old British fort at the river terrace's southern end.

This settlement is generally identified with the  listed among the 28 cities of Britain in the History of the Britons attributed to Nennius. This is probably not a British name but an adaption of its Old English name , "fort of the Weogoran".

The Anglo-Saxons

The settlement was eventually subsumed by the emerging Kingdom of Mercia, In 680, Worcester was chosen—in preference to both the much larger Gloucester and the royal court at Winchcombe—to be the seat of a new bishopric. This site of the new St Peter's was probably chosen due to the presence of Roman-era fortifications; many Roman sites were reused in this period by church communities, because of their perceived prestige.

Two further churches were established by 800, St Margaret's and St Alban's. Between the four religious communities, along with people supplying the basics needed for everyday life, a considerable number of people would have lived in the settlement. Nevertheless, the site was an essentially private settlement. Worcester appears frequently in the historic records prior to the Viking era, often with reference to the church and monastic communities, and showing evidence of extensive ecclesiastical ownership of lands. In this early phase, the Bishop was already a powerful figure, collecting considerable dues from lands and properties owned, including the Droitwich saltworks.

The city became a public settlement during King Alfred's reign, when it was chosen to be the site of a 'burh', or fortified town, as part of efforts to create a network of defensible sites able to resist Viking invasions. The earls of Mercia fortified Worcester "for the protection of all the people" at the request of Bishop Werfrith. It appears that maintenance of the defences was to be paid for by the townspeople. A unique document detailing this and privileges granted to the church also outlines the existence of Worcester's market and borough court, differentiation between church and market quarters within the city, as well as the role of the King in relation to the roads.

Worcester's fortifications would most likely have established the line of the wall that was extant until the 1600s, perhaps excepting the south east area near the former castle. It is referred to as a wall by contemporaries, so may have been of stone.

 Worcester in the years before the first millennium was a centre of monastic learning and church power. Oswald of Worcester was an important reformer, appointed Bishop in 961, jointly with York. The last Anglo-Saxon Bishop of Worcester, Wulfstan, or St Wulstan, was also an important reformer, and stayed in post until his death in 1095.

Worcester became the focus of tax resistance against the Danish Harthacanute. Two huscarls were killed in May 1041 while attempting to collect taxes for the expanded navy, after being driven into the Priory, where they were murdered. A military force was sent to deal with the non-payment, while the townspeople attempted to defend themselves by moving to and occupying the island of Bevere, two miles up river, where they were then besieged. After Harthacnut's men had sacked the city and set it alight, agreement was reached.

Worcester was also the site of a mint during the late Anglo-Saxon period, with seven moneyers in the reign of Edward the Confessor. This implies a middling role in trade for the city.

Medieval

Early medieval
Worcester was, for tax purposes, counted within Worcestershire's rural administration units (known as Hundreds) at the start of the Norman period. It was administratively independent.

The first Norman Sheriff of Worcestershire, Urse d'Abetot oversaw the construction of a new castle at Worcester, although nothing now remains of the castle. Worcester Castle was in place by 1069, its outer bailey built on land that had previously been the cemetery for the monks of the Worcester cathedral chapter. The motte of the castle overlooked the river, just south of the cathedral.

Worcester's growth and position as a market town distributing goods and produce came from its river crossing and bridge, and its position on the road network. In the 14th century, the nearest bridges over the Severn were at Gloucester and Bridgnorth. The main road from London to mid-Wales ran through Worcester. The road north west ran to Kidderminster, Bridgnorth and Shrewsbury; and the road north through Bromsgrove connected to Coventry, and towards Derby. The road southward connected to Tewkesbury and Gloucester.

There had been a bridge in Worcester since at least the 11th century; it was replaced in the early 14th century. This bridge, situated below the current Newport Street, had six arches on piers with starlings, and the middle pier had a gatehouse.

The city walls' upkeep was paid for by the residents. The walls included bastions and a watercourse. The course of the wall was fairly irregular. The entrances to the city were through defensive gates, constructed at different times, including St. Martin's Gate in the east, Sidbury Gate to the south, Friar Gate, Edgar Tower and Water Gate; there were six gates by the 16th century.

 Worcester was also a centre of medieval religious life; there were several monasteries until the dissolution. These included the Greyfriars, Blackfriars, Penitent Sisters and the Benedictine Priory, now Worcester Cathedral. Monastic houses provided hospitals and education, including Worcester School. The St. Wulstan Hospital was founded around 1085 and was dissolved with the monasteries in 1540. The St. Oswald Hospital was possibly founded by St Oswald. Substantial lands and property in Worcester were held by the church.

Domesday Book also records a considerable number of town houses belonging to rural landowners, presumably used as residences while selling produce from their lands.

In the 1100s, Worcester suffered a number of city fires. The first was on 19 June 1113, destroying town, castle and cathedral, and the second in November 1131.

The following century, the town (then better defended) was attacked several times (in 1139, 1150 and 1151) during the Anarchy, i.e. civil war between King Stephen and Empress Matilda, daughter of Henry I. The 1139 attack again resulted in fire and destruction of a portion of the city, with citizens being held for ransom.

Another fire in 1189 destroyed much of the city for the fourth time that century.

Worcester received its first royal charter in 1189. This set out the annual payment made to the Crown as £24 per annum, and set out that the city would deal directly with the Crown's Exchequer, rather than through the county sheriff, who would no longer have general jurisdiction over the city. However, under King John, Worcester's charter was not renewed, which allowed him to levy increasing and arbitrary taxation (tallage) on Worcester.

King John made eleven visits to Worcester, including at his first Easter as King in 1200. Wulstan was made a saint in 1203, and John visited his shrine in 1207. He appears to have developed an attachment to Wulstan's cult because he appeared to support the authority of kings.

John attempted to claim the right to appoint English bishops, which led him into a long dispute with the Pope. Bishop Mauger of Worcester was appointed by the Pope to enforce his Interdict, alongside the Bishops of London and Ely. He was forced into exile and his possessions confiscated as a result.

John spent Christmas 1214 at Worcester, During his disputes with the Barons over the administration of justice, before returning to London where discussions leading to Magna Carta began. In 1216, the barons asked the French Dauphin to depose John. This brought conflict to Worcestershire, where the county 's leaders organised against him, and allowed William Marshall, son of the Earl of Pembroke, who was loyal to John, to take possession of Worcester as governor. Ranulph, Earl of Chester attacked the city, took the castle and ransacked the Cathedral, where the garrison had attempted to take shelter. Marshal was warned of the attack by his father, and was able to escape.

The Priory was fined for protecting the rebels and were forced to melt down the treasures used to adorn St Wulfstan's tomb. The city of Worcester was fined £100 for its role; the lack of a Charter for the city enabled this arbitrary payment to be levied.

John was buried in the cathedral near Wulfstan's altar after he died.

In 1227, under King Henry III Worcester regained its charter and was granted more freedoms. The annual tax was increased to £30. The sheriff was again removed from his role representing the city to the Crown, except in some limited circumstances. A guild of merchants was created, creating a trading monopoly for those admitted. Villeins who resided in the city for a year and day, and were members of the guild, were to be deemed free. Finally, the charter granted rights to levy tolls and taxation, and exemption from certain duties and taxes otherwise due to the Crown. The charter was renewed in 1264.

Worcester's institutions grew at a slower pace than most county towns and had detectably archaic echoes. It is likely that this is related to the power of the local aristocracy.

Jewish life, persecution and expulsions

Worcester had a small Jewish population by the late 12th century. It was one of a number of places allowed to keep records of debts, in an official locked chest known as an archa. (An archa or arca (plural archae/arcae) was a municipal chest in which deeds were preserved.)  Jewish life probably centred around what is now Copenhagen Street.

The Diocese was notably hostile to the Jewish community in Worcester. Peter of Blois was commissioned by a Bishop of Worcester, probably John of Coutances, to write a significant anti-Judaic treatise Against the Perfidy of Jews around 1190.

William de Blois, as Bishop of Worcester, imposed particularly strict rules on Jews within the diocese in 1219. As elsewhere in England, Jews were officially compelled to wear square white badges, supposedly representing tabulae. In most places, this requirement was relinquished as long as fines were paid. In addition to enforcing the church laws on wearing badges, Blois tried to impose additional restrictions on usury, and wrote to Pope Gregory in 1229 to ask for better enforcement and further, harsher measures. In response, the Papacy demanded that Christians be prevented from working in Jewish homes, "lest temporal profit be preferred to the zeal of Christ", and enforcement of the wearing of badges.

A national assembly of Jewish notables was summoned to Worcester by the Crown in 1240 to assess their wealth for taxation; at which Henry III "squeezed the largest tallage of the thirteenth century from his Jewish subjects."

In 1263 Worcester's Jewish residents were attacked by a baronial force led by Robert Earl Ferrers and Henry de Montfort. Most were killed. Ferrers used this opportunity to remove the titles to his debts by taking the archae.

The massacre in Worcester was part of a wider campaign by the De Montforts and their allies in the run up to the Second Barons' War, aimed at undermining Henry III. Simon de Montfort had previously been engaged in a campaign of persecution of Jewish communities in Leicester. A massacre of London's Jewry also took place during the war.

A few years later, in 1275, those still remaining in Worcester were forced to move to Hereford, as Jews were expelled from towns under the jurisdiction of the queen mother.

Evolution of craft guilds

Through the medieval and early modern period, Worcester developed a system of craft guilds. Guilds regulated who could work in a trade, trade practices and training, and provided social support for members.

The city's late medieval ordinances banned tilers from forming a guild, and encouraged tilers to settle in Worcester to trade freely. Roofs of thatch and wooden chimneys were banned in order to reduce fire risks.

Late medieval
Worcester's Ordinances of the sixth year of Edward IV, renewed in 1496–7, and detailed in 82 clauses, give a detailed picture of life and city organisation in the late medieval period. They were to be enforced by the city's bailiffs. Chamberlains received and accounted for rents and other income and the use of common lands within Worcester was set out. Trade regulations covered bread and ale. Others dealt with sanitation, fire regulations and upkeep of the city wall, quays and pavements. Public order and crimes including affray are covered. Citizens were given the privilege of being imprisoned underneath the Guildhall rather than in the town jail, except for the most serious offences.

The cloth industry was also regulated by the Ordinances. Apart from regulation of weights and measures, the ordinances also attempted to protect the artisans engaged in the trade. Payment in kind was banned, with fines of 20 shillings for anyone making payment other than with gold and silver. People were only to be employed if they lived in the city and its suburbs.

Worcester elected members of Parliament at the Guildhall, by males "of suche as hev dwellynge wtin the ffraunches and by the moste voice." That is, by shouting. Members of Parliament had to own freehold property worth 40 shillings a year, and be "of good name and fame, not outlawed, not acombred in accyons as nygh as men may knowe, for worshipp of the seid cite". Their wages were levied by the Constable.

The ordinances also mandated that the then-neglected pageants of the crafts take place five times a year, and set out a few general rules for newcomers expecting to set up their trade in the city. A master craftsman was obliged to make customary payments to the wardens of the craft. A journeyman would after a fortnight have to pay dues to the wardens.

The city council was organised by a system of co-option. There were 24 members of the high chamber, and 48 of the lower chamber. Committees appointed the two Bailiffs and made financial decisions, while the two chambers agreed the city's rules, or ordinances.

By late medieval times the population had grown to 1,025 families, excluding the cathedral quarter, so probably stood under 10,000. Worcester had grown beyond the limits of its walls with a number of suburbs.

The manufacture of cloth and allied trades started to become a large local industry. For instance, Leland stated in the mid 1500s that "The welthe of the towne of Worcestar standithe most by draping, and noe towne of England, at this present tyme, maketh so many cloathes yearly as this towne doth."

The glove-making trade has its roots in this period.

Early modern
 The Dissolution saw the Priory's status change, as it lost its Benedictine monks. There were around 36 monks plus the Prior at dissolution in 1540 and some 16 were given pensions immediately or soon after, the rest being employed in the new Deanery. It was necessary to establish 'public schools' to replace monastic education in Worcester as elsewhere. This led to the establishment of King's School. Worcester School continued to teach. St Oswald's Hospital survived the dissolution, later providing almshouses; the charity and its housing survives to the present.

The city was given the right to elect a Mayor and was designated a county corporate in 1621, giving it autonomy from local government. From this point, Worcester was governed by a mayor, recorder and six aldermen. Councillors were selected through co-option.

Worcester in this period contained green spaces such as orchards and fields between its main streets within the city wall boundary, as evidenced by Speed's map of 1610. The walls were still more or less complete at this time, but suburbs had also been established beyond them.

Civil War

Worcester equivocated about whether to support the Parliamentary cause before the outbreak of civil war in 1642, eventually siding with Parliament. The city was swiftly occupied by the Royalists, who billeted their troops in the city and used the cathedral to store munitions. Essex briefly retook the city for Parliament after the skirmish at the Battle of Powick Bridge, the first engagement of the war. Parliamentary troops then ransacked the cathedral building. Stained glass was smashed and the organ destroyed, along with library books and monuments. Essex was soon forced to withdraw, after the Battle of Edgehill.

The city spent the rest of the First Civil War Royalist control, as did the county, for the most part. Worcester was a garrison town with a Royalist governor), and had to bear high taxation for of sustaining and billeting a large number of Royalist troops. The city walls which were in a lamentable state at the start of the war were strengthened, and houses close to the walls were demolished by Worcester women after the first siege in 1643 to give the defenders a clear field of fire.

As Royalist power collapsed in May 1646, Worcester was placed under siege for the second time. Worcester had around 5,000 civilians, together with a Royalist garrison of around 1,500 men, facing a 2,500-5,000 strong force of the New Model Army. Worcester finally surrendered on 23 July, bringing the first civil war to a close in Worcestershire.

In 1651 a Scottish army, 16,000 strong, marched south along the west coast in support of Charles II's attempt to regain the Crown. When the army approached, Worcester's council voted to surrender, fearing further violence and destruction. The Parliamentary garrison withdrew to Evesham in the face of the overwhelming numbers against them. The Scots were billeted in and around the city, again at great expense and causing new anxiety for the residents. The Scots were joined by very limited local forces, including a company of 60 men under Francis Talbot.

The Battle of Worcester (3 September 1651), took place in the fields a little to the west and south of the city, near the village of Powick. Charles II was easily defeated by Cromwell's forces of 30,000 men. Charles II returned to his headquarters in what is now known as King Charles House in the Cornmarket, before fleeing in disguise with Talbot's help to Boscobel House in Shropshire, from where he eventually escaped to France.

In the aftermath of the battle, Worcester was heavily looted by the Parliamentarian army, with an estimated £80,000 of damage done. Around 10,000 prisoners, mostly Scots, were held captive, and either sent to work on the Fens drainage projects, or transported to the New World.

From 1646 to 1660, the bishopric was abolished and the cathedral fell into disrepair.

After the Restoration

After the restoration of the monarchy in 1660, Worcester cleverly used its location as the site of the final battles of the First Civil War (1646) and Third Civil War (1651) to mount an appeal for compensation from the new King Charles II. As part of this and not based upon any historical fact, it invented the epithet Fidelis Civitas (The Faithful City) and this motto has since been incorporated into the city's coat of arms.
Around 1690, a news-sheet that started publication, which later became known as one of the oldest newspapers in the world, Berrow's Worcester Journal.

Worcester Guildhall was rebuilt in 1721, replacing the earlier hall on the same site. The now Grade I listed Queen Anne style building was described by Nikolaus Pevsner as "a splendid town hall, as splendid as any of C18 England".

Worcester's historic bridge was replaced, at a cost of £29,843 including its approaches, opening on 17 September 1781. As the town's population expanded, the green areas between the main streets filled with housing and back streets. Nevertheless, the size of the city and suburbs was roughly the same as it was in the early 1600s. Large stretches of the walls of the city had been removed by 1796.

The Royal Worcester Porcelain Company factory was founded by Dr John Wall in 1751.

Industrial revolution, Victorian and Edwardian eras

 During the late 18th and early 19th centuries, Worcester was a major centre for glove-making, employing nearly half the glovers in England at its peak (over 30,000 people). In 1815 the Worcester and Birmingham Canal opened, allowing Worcester goods to be transported to a larger conurbation.

 Later in that century the industry declined after import taxes on foreign competitors, mainly from France, were greatly reduced.

Riots took place in 1831, in response to the defeat of the Reform Bill, reflecting discontent with the city administration and the wider lack of democratic representation. Riots occurred elsewhere, including Bristol.  Local government reform took place in 1835, which for the first time created election procedures for councillors, but also restricted the ability of the city to buy and sell property, requiring Treasury permission. Until that year, the legal distinction between a select group of citizens with specific privileges and other residents of the town had survived.

Political troubles continued throughout the Victorian and Edwardian period, with Worcester becoming notorious for corrupt political practices. Through the period, attempts were made to reduce and eliminate electoral bribery through national legislation. As the franchise widened, attempts to fix elections through bribes, fake employment in campaigns and gifts of beer became very expensive, making it politically preferable to crack down on them. Nevertheless, such practices persisted in Worcester, allowing Worcester to retain Conservative representation in 1892 against a Liberal landslide, leading to investigations being made. A Royal Commission in 1906 finally found that around 500 men on low incomes regarded the purchase of their vote as something they should expect as of right, and a welcome addition to their subsistence. The campaign by liberals to end electoral corruption was not welcomed, and led to underperformance by that party for many years.

The British Medical Association (BMA) was founded in the Board Room of the old Worcester Royal Infirmary building in Castle Street in 1832. 

Lea & Perrins Worcestershire sauce has been made and bottled in Worcester since around 1837, first produced by two chemists, it is claimed according to a recipe supplied by an unnamed "Nobleman of the County". Production expanded, and a new factory was opened at the Midland Road on 16 October 1897, which accommodated exports to the USA. 

Railways came to Worcester in 1850, with the opening Shrub Hill station, jointly owned by the Oxford, Worcester and Wolverhampton Railway and the Midland Railway, initially running to Birmingham only. Foregate Street was opened in 1860 by the Hereford and Worcester Railway, quickly incorporated into the West Midland Railway. The WMR lines became part of the Great Western Railway after 1 August 1863. The railways also gave Worcester thousands of jobs with just under half of all GWR passenger coaches built in Worcester and the three signalling factories including the largest railway signalling company in the World: McKenzie & Holland.

In 1882 Worcester hosted the Worcestershire Exhibition, inspired by the earlier Great Exhibition in London. There were sections for exhibits of fine arts (over 600 paintings), historical manuscripts and industrial items. The profit was £1,867.9s.6d and the number of visitors is recorded as 222,807. Some of the profit from the exhibition was used to build the Victoria Institute in Foregate Street, Worcester, which opened on 1 October 1896 and originally housed the city art gallery and museum.

The late-Victorian period saw the growth of ironfounders, including Heenan & Froude, Hardy & Padmore and McKenzie & Holland.

1914 to present
Worcester was a centre for recruitment of soldiers to fight in the First World War, into the Worcestershire Regiment, which was based at Norton Barracks. The regiment took part in early battles in the war, most notably at the Battle of Gheluvelt in October 1914, which prevented the German army from reaching Belgian ports.

The newly-appointed Vicar of St Paul's, Geoffrey Studdert Kennedy, was among those urging Worcester's men to enlist. He became an army chaplain, later known as 'Woodbine Willy', as he brought cigarettes to soldiers during fighting and exposed himself to physical danger, earning him a Military Cross. Shops in Worcester organised collections to supply him with cigarettes. His experience of war ushed him towards pacifism and Christian Socialism. After the war, he left his Worcester parish, but kept a house in the city for the rest of his life.

Rail reorganisation in 1922 saw the Midland Railway's routes from Shrub Hill absorbed into the London, Midland and Scottish Railway.

The inter-war years saw the rapid growth of engineering, producing machine tools (James Archdale, H.W. Ward), castings for the motor industry (Worcester Windshields and Casements), mining machinery (Mining Engineering Company which later became part of Joy Mining Machinery) and open-top cans( Williamsons, though G H Williamson and Sons had become part of the Metal Box Co in 1930); later the company became Carnaud Metal Box plc).

During the Second World War, the city was chosen to be the seat of an evacuated government in case of mass German invasion. The former RAF station RAF Worcester was located east of Northwick.

A fuel storage depot was constructed in 1941-2 by Shell Mex & BP (later operated by Texaco) for the government on the eastern bank of the River Severn, about one mile south of Worcester.  There were six 4,000 ton semi-buried tanks for the storage of white oils.  It had no rail or road loading facilities but distribution could be carried out by barge through the Diglis basin and the depot could receive fuel either by barge or the GPSS pipeline network.  It was at one time used as a civil reserve storing gas oil and then stored aviation kerosene for USAFE.  In the early 1990s it was closed down and the site was sold for housing in the 2000s.

By the middle of the 20th century, only a few Worcester gloving companies survived since gloves became less fashionable and free trade allowed in cheaper imports from the Far East. Nevertheless, at least three large glove manufacturing companies survived until the late 20th century: Dent Allcroft, Fownes and Milore. Queen Elizabeth II's coronation gloves were designed and manufactured in the Worcester-based Dent Allcroft & Co. factory.

In the 1950s and 1960s large areas of the medieval centre of Worcester were demolished and rebuilt as a result of decisions by town planners. This was condemned by many such as Pevsner who described it as a "totally incomprehensible... act of self-mutilation". There is still a significant area of medieval Worcester remaining, examples of which can be seen along City Walls Road, Friar Street and New Street, but it is a small fraction of what was present before the redevelopments.

The current city boundaries date from 1974, when the Local Government Act 1972 transferred the parishes of Warndon and St. Peter the Great County into the city.

Worcester Porcelain closed down in 2009 due to the recession. The site of the factory still houses the Museum of Royal Worcester. and handful of decorators are still employed at the factory. Since 2015 there has been extensive re-development of the quarter, entirely devoted to housing.

While part of the Royal Infirmary hospital was demolished to make way for the University of Worcester's new city campus, the original Georgian building has been preserved. One of the old wards opened as a medical museum, the Infirmary, in 2012.

The foundry heritage of the city is represented by Morganite Crucible at Norton which produces graphitic shaped products and cements for use in the modern industry.

The city is home to the European manufacturing plant of Yamazaki Mazak Corporation, a global Japanese machine tool builder, which was established in 1980.

Images

See also
List of Bishops of Worcester
Worcester City Art Gallery & Museum
Jewish Community of Worcester

Notes

Explanatory citations

Citations

References

General

Medieval history

Civil War

Twentieth century

Further reading

External links

History of the City of Worcester